Richard Baynard (c. 1371 – 7 January 1434) was an English administrator, MP and Speaker of the House of Commons of England in 1421.

He was the fourth son and heir of Thomas Baynard of Messing, Essex.

He was elected Knight of the shire (MP) for Essex six times (1406, Nov 1414, Dec 1421, 1423, 1427 and 1433). and elected Speaker of the House in Dec 1421.

He was Controller, customs and subsidies Ipswich, Suffolk (1407–1408) and Keeper of Colchester gaol, Essex before March 1417.

He died in 1434. He had married four times. Firstly  Joan, secondly Joyce, daughter and heiress of John Vyne, a London draper thirdly another Joan, daughter and heiress of John Sandherst, a London chandler, and fourthly Grace, daughter of John Burgoyne, and widow of John Peyton of Easthorpe, Essex with whom he had two sons and four daughters. He was survived by his widow Grace, his natural sons Richard and Lewis and an illegitimate son, John, and two of his four daughters.

References
Citations

Bibliography
History of Parliament BAYNARD, Richard (c.1371-1434) of Messing, Essex

1370s births
1434 deaths
Year of birth uncertain
People from the Borough of Colchester
Speakers of the House of Commons of England
English MPs 1406
English MPs November 1414
English MPs December 1421
English MPs 1423
English MPs 1427
English MPs 1433